The 2016 season will be Stjarnan's 14th season in Úrvalsdeild and their 8th consecutive season.

Rúnar Páll Sigmundsson will head coach the team for the third season running. He will be assisted by Brynjar Björn Gunnarsson.

Along with Úrvalsdeild, Stjarnan will compete in Lengjubikarinn and Borgunarbikarinn.

First Team
 These players competed in Úrvalsdeild, Borgunarbikarinn and Lengjubikarinn

Transfers and loans

Transfers In

Transfers Out

Loans in

Loans out

Pre-season

Fótbolti.net Cup
Stjarnan took part in the 2016 Fótbolti.net Tournament, a pre-season tournament held in January every year.

The team played in Group 2 along with ÍBV, Breiðablik and Víkingur Ó. Stjarnan finished second in the group behind ÍBV but level on points with seven. Stjarnan had an inferior goal difference.

Stjarnan were heavily defeated in the game for the bronze against ÍA. Even though Stjarnan saw a lot of the ball it was ÍA who scored the goals and after 90 minutes ÍA had scored 6 against Stjarnan's 1.

Lengjubikarinn
Stjarnan played in Group 1 in the Icelandic league cup, Lengjubikarinn along with ÍBV, Valur, Huginn, Keflavík and Fram.

After three wins and two defeats Stjarnan finished third in the group and failed to advance through to the knockout stages.

Matches

Úrvalsdeild

League table

Matches

Results by matchday

Summary of results

Points breakdown
 Points at home: 7
 Points away from home: 4
 6 Points:
 4 Points:
 3 Points:
 2 Points:
 1 Point: 
 0 Points:

Borgunarbikarinn
Stjarnan came into the Icelandic Cup, Borgunarbikarinn, in the 3rd round. The team was drawn against Víkingur Ó. Stjarnan won the game after a penalty shoot-out. The game had ended 2–2 after 90 minutes.

Matches

Statistics

Goalscorers
Includes all competitive matches.

Goalkeeping
Includes all competitive matches.

Appearances
Includes all competitive matches.
Numbers in parentheses are sub appearances

Disciplinary
Includes all competitive matches.

Squad Stats
Includes all competitive matches; Úrvalsdeild, Borgunarbikar and Lengjubikar.
{| class="wikitable" style="text-align:center;"
|-
!  style="background:#0000ff; color:white; width:150px;"|
!  style="background:#0000ff; color:white; width:75px;"|Úrvalsdeild
!  style="background:#0000ff; color:white; width:75px;"|Borgunarbikar
!  style="background:#0000ff; color:white; width:75px;"|Lengjubikar
!  style="background:#0000ff; color:white; width:75px;"|Total
|-
|align=left|Games played       || 6 || 1 || 5 || 12
|-
|align=left|Games won          || 3 || 1 || 3 || 7 (58%)
|-
|align=left|Games drawn        || 2 || 0 || 0 || 2 (17%)
|-
|align=left|Games lost         || 1 || 0 || 2 ||  3 (25%)
|-
|align=left|Goals scored       || 13 || 2 || 18 || 33
|-
|align=left|Goals conceded     || 6 || 2 || 7 || 15
|-
|align=left|Clean sheets       || 2 || 0 || 2 || 4
|-
|align=left|Yellow cards       || 11 || 1 || 3 ||  15
|-
|align=left|Red cards         || 0 || 0 || 0 || 0
|-

References

2016 in Icelandic football
Úrvalsdeild karla (football)